Breault is a surname. Notable people with the surname include:

Ann Breault (1938–2021), Canadian teacher, nurse, journalist and politician
Frank Breault (born 1967), Canadian ice hockey player
Henri Breault (1909–1983), Canadian doctor and medical researcher 
Henry Breault (1900–1941), United States Navy submarine sailor
Kevin D. Breault, American sociologist 
Michael Breault (born 1958), American game designer, editor, and author
Robert Breault (born 1963), American operatic tenor